Stjepan Tomas (born 6 March 1976) is a Croatian professional football manager and former player. His previous clubs include Dinamo Zagreb, Vicenza Calcio, Como, Fenerbahçe, Galatasaray and Rubin Kazan. He played as centre-back, and at one point of his career as defensive midfielder.

Club career
Tomas August 2007, he signed a two-year contract with Russian club FC Rubin Kazan, for a fee of €4.8 million. On 31 January 2010, he signed a contract with Turkish side Gaziantepspor until end of the season. Then he moved to Bucaspor, a newly promoted Süper Lig team.

International career
Tomas made his debut for Croatia in an April 1998 friendly match against Poland, coming on as a 60th-minute substitute for Tomislav Rukavina, and earned a total of 49 caps, scoring 1 goal. He was part of the team at the 2002 FIFA World Cup, where he played in all three games in the group stage before they were eliminated. He was also on the national squad at Euro 2004, but did not play any games in the tournament. He also played for the national team in their third and last game at the 2006 FIFA World Cup against Australia which became his final international appearance.

Managerial career
On 15 November 2019, Tomas was appointed manager of Turkish Süper Lig club Antalyaspor.

On 21 June 2022, Tomas was appointed as Head Coach of Moldovan Super Liga club Sheriff Tiraspol. Four months later, on 25 October 2022, Tomas resigned from the role following the clubs first League defeat of the season, to Petrocub Hîncești, and two days before an away trip to Manchester United in the UEFA Europa League.

Honours
Dinamo Zagreb
Prva HNL: 1995–96, 1996–97, 1997–98, 1998–99, 1999–2000
Croatian Cup: 1996, 1997, 1998

Fenerbahçe
Süper Lig: 2003–04

Galatasaray
Süper Lig: 2005–06
Turkish Cup: 2005

Rubin Kazan
Russian Premier League: 2008, 2009

References

External links
 

Interview-biography  

1976 births
Living people
People from Bugojno
Croats of Bosnia and Herzegovina
Bosnia and Herzegovina emigrants to Croatia
Association football central defenders
Croatian footballers
Croatia international footballers
2002 FIFA World Cup players
UEFA Euro 2004 players
2006 FIFA World Cup players
NK Istra players
GNK Dinamo Zagreb players
L.R. Vicenza players
Como 1907 players
Fenerbahçe S.K. footballers
Galatasaray S.K. footballers
FC Rubin Kazan players
Gaziantepspor footballers
Bucaspor footballers
Croatian Football League players
Serie B players
Serie A players
Süper Lig players
Russian Premier League players
Croatian expatriate footballers
Expatriate footballers in Italy
Croatian expatriate sportspeople in Italy
Expatriate footballers in Turkey
Croatian expatriate sportspeople in Turkey
Expatriate footballers in Russia
Croatian expatriate sportspeople in Russia
Croatian football managers
Antalyaspor managers
Çaykur Rizespor managers
Göztepe S.K. managers
FC Sheriff Tiraspol managers
Croatian expatriate football managers
Expatriate football managers in Turkey
Expatriate football managers in Moldova
Croatian expatriate sportspeople in Moldova
Gaziantepspor non-playing staff
Akhisarspor non-playing staff
İstanbul Başakşehir F.K. non-playing staff